Allan Kenneth Simmons (born September 25, 1951) is a Canadian former professional ice hockey player who played eleven games in the National Hockey League for the California Golden Seals and Boston Bruins between 1972 and 1975. He also played several years in the minor leagues during his career, which lasted from 1971 to 1976.

Career statistics

Regular season and playoffs

External links

1951 births
Boston Braves (AHL) players
Boston Bruins players
California Golden Seals draft picks
California Golden Seals players
Canadian expatriate ice hockey players in the United States
Canadian ice hockey defencemen
Columbus Golden Seals players
Ice hockey people from Winnipeg
Living people
Providence Reds players
Rochester Americans players
Salt Lake Golden Eagles (WHL) players
Winnipeg Jets (WHL) players